Nordfyenske Jernbane (Railway of North Funen, abbreviated NFJ) was a Danish railway connecting Odense to the coastal town of Bogense.

The line was closed on March 31, 1966, simultaneously with the two other railways on northern Funen, OMB and OKMJ. Though the tracks have been removed, many of the station buildings still exist, being used for various purposes.

References

External links 
 NFJ details at South Funen Heritage Railway's website

Railway lines opened in 1882
Railway companies established in 1882
Railway companies disestablished in 1966
Closed railway lines in Denmark